Prionoceridae is a small family of beetles, in the suborder Polyphaga. They form a group within the cleroid beetles and were formerly treated as a subfamily (Prionocerinae) within the family Melyridae. Very little is known of their life history but most species are pollen feeders as adults and occur in large numbers during spring or the host flowering season. Larvae are predatory or feed on decomposing wood.

Description
Beetles in the family are elongate with soft elytra. The elytra are often covered with rows of hairs. The margin of the eyes are not round but notched anteriorly. The head faces forward (prognathous) and the clypeal region is produced into a short flat snout. Each of the legs have five tarsi (5-5-4 in the Oedemeridae) with simple claws and a single spur on the pro-tibia. Male Idgia and Prionocerus have a comb on the inner edge of the distal tarsal segment of the foreleg. The genera Nacerdes and Xanthochroa in the family Oedemeridae and some Cantharidae bear resemblance to some of the Prionoceridae.

Members of the family were formerly included as a subfamily within the closely related Melyridae (the genus Lobonyx in Dasytinae). The fossil record of Prionoceridae has been recorded from the Middle Jurassic Daohugou beds of China (Idgiaites jurassicus), the Cenomanian Burmese amber (Cretaidgia burmensis) and Ypresian Hat creek Amber from Canada (Prionocerites tattriei).

Diversity 
There are around 150 species in three genera; Idgia  (Palaeotropical), Lobonyx  (mostly Palaearctic), and Prionocerus . 

The following is a partial list of the species that have been described (the generic placement and validity are unverified and likely to be out of date):

†Cretaidgia 
†C. burmensis 
Idgia 
 See genus article
†Idgiaites
†I. jurassicus
Lobonyx 
L. aeneus 
L. gracilis 
L. guerryi 
L. thoracicus 
†Prionocerites 
†P. tattriei 
Prionocerus 
P. bicolor 
P. caeruleipennis 
P. championi 
P. malaysiacus 
P. paiensis 
P. opacipennis 
P. viridiflavus  
P. wittmeri

References

Cleroidea
Polyphaga families